Takau is a district in Fantswam (Kafanchan) Chiefdom of Jema'a Local Government Area in southern Kaduna state in the Middle Belt region of Nigeria. It is a suburban area of the town of Kafanchan. The postal code of the area is 801139.

Etymology
The word Takau comes from two words in the Fantswam dialect of the Tyap language, meaning "leeward side of mahogany trees".

Demographics

Ethnic composition

Indigenous people
The indigenous people of Takau are the Fantswam people. The district consists of villages occupied by this people.

Atyap peoples
The Atyap ethnolinguistic group is composed of about eight subgroups of which the Fantswam are a part. Other members of this group with significant populations in the area include:  Agworok, Asholyio, Atakad, Atyap and Bajju.

Other ethnicities
Other peoples found in Takau district include those of Southern Kaduna extract, most notably the Gwong, Ham, Nikyob-Nindem; the Igbo people, most of whom came during the early part of the 20th century after the Kafanchan railway line was completed in 1927. They make up a significant population in the area and live mostly in quarters built for the railway workers.

Religion

The main religion practiced in this area is Christianity. The Protestant denomination is the larger one, especially among indigenous people and Catholicism especially among Igbos. There are a number of churches in Takau, including: ECWA 1, ECWA 2, ECWA Gospel, St. Timothy Catholic church, St. Thomas Catholic church, and others.

Politics

Government
Takau is led by a District Head, appointed by the Agwam Fantswam (Chief of Kafanchan), who has under him Village Heads and each village head likewise has Ward Heads under his authority.

Village units
Takau is made up of settlements such as:
 Baita (also Bainta)
 Kuka
 Madaki
 Maji
 Sot Rago (H. Ungwa Rago)
 Sot Shemang (H. Ungwa Shemang)
 Takau Bunian (also Takau I, Ma-Kanat)
 Takau Kali (also Zagyong; H. Takau Gida)
 Takau Takai (also Takau II; Ma-Akau)
 Yashie (Nyanshyie)

Education

The Kafanchan campus of the Kaduna State University is located in Takau. There are also a number of primary and secondary (high) schools such as Government secondary school, Takau, amongst others.

Economy

Among the economic activities in Takau are small farm holdings (subsistence farming), ginger processing, metal welding works, block making industry, etc.

References

External links

Populated places in Kaduna State
Kafanchan